Argila is a 1968 West German drama film directed by Werner Schroeter and starring Carla Egerer, Magdalena Montezuma and Sigurd Salto. The film was part of the developing New German Cinema movement, and along with Eika Katappa established Magdalena Montezuma as the star of German underground filmmaking.

Plot 
Three women around a mute man.

Background 
Beginner, Werner Schroeter, proceeds to a sophisticated setting of characters and images by a double projection, one in mute black and white, the other sound and in color, with a few seconds delay.

Cast
 Carla Egerer
 Magdalena Montezuma
 Sigurd Salto
 Gisela Trowe

References

Bibliography 
 Elsaesser, Thomas. New German Cinema: A History. Macmillan Education, 1989.

External links 
 

1969 films
1960s avant-garde and experimental films
German avant-garde and experimental films
West German films
1960s German-language films
Films directed by Werner Schroeter
1960s German films